Michael was a medieval Bishop of Hereford elect. He was a canon of Lichfield Cathedral before being elected by the cathedral chapter of Hereford Cathedral to succeed Ralph de Maidstone, but the election was quashed in August 1240.

Citations

References

 

Bishops of Hereford
13th-century English Roman Catholic bishops